Headcrash is a satirical cyberpunk novel by Bruce Bethke, published in 1995 by Warner Books. It won the Philip K. Dick Award in 1995.

It follows Jack Burroughs, who loses his bureaucratic corporate job and goes undercover on the InfoBahn (internet), creating a new persona as a popular, cool virtual character aliased MAXK00L, in a virtual reality social media area:

Bethke unintentionally named the entire cyberpunk subgenre of science fiction in his 1983 story "Cyberpunk".

Reception
Enjoying moderate sales and mixed reviews (often centering around whether the reviewer saw it as satire or a failed attempt at sincere comedy), the book went on to capture a few awards, most notably the Philip K. Dick Award for best paperback novel in 1995.

References

1995 novels
Cyberpunk novels